Nazi leader Adolf Hitler may have used look-alikes as political decoys, though there is no evidence that he did so during his life. The Soviet Union variously claimed that bodies resembling Hitler were found in the aftermath of the Battle of Berlin, during which Hitler committed suicide. The most prominent evidence is Soviet footage of a body identified as Gustav Weler, found in the garden of the Reich Chancellery. Weler was said to have worked in the Reich Chancellery, perhaps as a cook. Conspiracy theorists have cited this body double as an example of alleged evidence that Hitler escaped Germany.

Supporting claims 

The 1939 book The Strange Death of Adolf Hitler alleges that the Nazi Party used four people as doubles for Hitler, including the author, who claims that the real dictator died in 1938 and that he subsequently took his place. The book was considered farcical in the year of its release and cannot be considered as being remotely reliable. In 1939, the Newspaper Enterprise Association (NEA), while admitting that the book has "practically no direct evidence of authenticity", defended it by citing the purported 1938 death of Julius Schreck as support for Hitler's use of doubles. The NEA claimed that Schreck was Hitler's chauffeur until 1934, and was riding in the back of a car being driven by Hitler, and took a bullet from a would-be Hitler assassin who did not expect Hitler to be driving. In fact, Schreck died in May 1936 after developing meningitis.

In late April 1945, Stockholm's "Free German Press Service" circulated a rumor that a Hitler double named August Wilhelm Bartholdy, supposedly a former grocer from Plauen, was called to Berlin to be filmed dying on the battlefield in Hitler's stead. The Germans émigrés stated, "He will act as Hitler's trump card, creating a hero legend around the Führer's death, while Hitler himself goes underground." Hitler died in Berlin on 30 April, with his dental remains subsequently being positively identified.

On 9 May 1945, The New York Times reported that a body was claimed by the Soviets to belong to Hitler. This was disputed by an anonymous servant, who stated that the body was that of a cook who was killed because of his resemblance to Hitler, and that the latter had escaped. On 6 June 1945, the United Press reported that four bodies had been found in Berlin resembling Hitler, purportedly burnt by the Red Army's flame throwers. One body was considered most likely to be that of Hitler. A few days later, on Soviet leader Joseph Stalin's orders, Soviet Marshal Georgy Zhukov presented the official narrative that Hitler had escaped, stating, "We have found no corpse that could be [his]." In mid-1945, a Soviet major told American sources that Hitler had survived and claimed of the place in the Reich Chancellery garden where his body was said to have been burned, "It is not true that Hitler was found there! Our experts have established that the man found here didn't look like Hitler at all. And we didn't find Eva Braun either!" During their Soviet captivity, SS valet Heinz Linge, SS guard Josef Henschel, and Hitler's pilot Hans Baur were questioned about whether Hitler escaped by leaving a body double. From 1951 to 1972, the National Police Gazette ran stories asserting that SS physician Ludwig Stumpfegger had switched out a double for Hitler to help the dictator fake his death.

In 1963, author Cornelius Ryan interviewed General B. S. Telpuchovski, a Soviet historian who was allegedly present during the aftermath of the Battle of Berlin. Telpuchovski claimed that on 2 May 1945, a burnt body he thought belonged to Hitler was found wrapped in a blanket. This supposed individual had been killed by a gunshot through the mouth, with an exit wound through the back of the head. Several dental bridges were purportedly found next to the body, because, Telpuchovski stated, "the force of the bullet had dislodged them from the mouth". In his 1966 book, The Last Battle, Ryan describes this body as that of Hitler, saying it had been buried "under a thin layer of earth". Telpuchovski had said there were a total of three Hitler candidates which had been burnt, apparently including a body double wearing mended socks, which he described as being in "remnants". Ryan quotes him as saying, "There was also the body of a man who was freshly killed but not burned."

Soviet journalist Lev Bezymenski details the darned-sock-wearing double in his 1968 book, The Death of Adolf Hitler. He quotes Ivan Klimenko, the commander of the Red Army's SMERSH unit, as stating that on the night of 3 May 1945, he witnessed Vizeadmiral Hans-Erich Voss seem to recognize a corpse as Hitler's in a dry water tank filled with other bodies in the garden of the Reich Chancellery. Although Klimenko had some doubts because the corpse was wearing mended socks, he briefly speculated that it belonged to Hitler. On 4 May, Soviet officers ordered that the body double be filmed. The footage shows the double with an apparent gunshot wound to the forehead. According to Klimenko, later on 4 May, Hitler and Eva Braun's true remains were discovered buried in a crater outside the Chancellery, wrapped in blankets and reburied, then re-exhumed the next day after the double was debunked as being Hitler. In 1992, journalist Ada Petrova found the footage in the Russian state archives; the body double had been identified as Gustav Weler. In their 1995 book, Petrova and Peter Watson assert that 'Weler' may have worked in the Reich Chancellery and occasionally stood in for Hitler as a political decoy.

In their 2011 book, Grey Wolf: The Escape of Adolf Hitler, British authors Simon Dunstan and Gerrard Williams cite "a noted facial recognition expert witness" in claiming that a double stood in for Hitler on his 20 March 1945 appearance with the Hitler Youth—citing this as the dictator's last public appearance. The book claims that in a deal with the U.S. Office of Strategic Services, on 28 April 1945 Hitler's private secretary, Martin Bormann, installed the alleged March 20 imposter and an actress in place of Hitler and Braun, then staged their deaths, possibly with Gestapo chief Heinrich Müller.

Arguments against 
Presiding judge at the Einsatzgruppen trial at Nuremberg Michael Musmanno wrote in 1948, "There is not a shred of evidence to show that Hitler ever had a double." Musmanno further states that "the several score immediate associates of Hitler whom I questioned expressly stated that Hitler never had a double." In his 1950 book about Hitler's death, Musmanno wrote:

To suggest as some sophomorically reasoning theorists have, including the noted author Emil Ludwig, that possibly it was a double of Hitler who died and was cremated is, without any evidence to support it, about as rational as to say that Hitler was carried away by angels. ... it is inconceivable that Hitler, with his self-assurance of superiority over any other human being, would concede the existence of anyone even superficially an artificial duplicate of himself.

Soviet war interpreter Elena Rzhevskaya (who safeguarded Hitler's dental remains until they could be identified by his dental staff) attributed the rumours of doubles to Soviet Colonel General Nikolai Berzarin's pledge to nominate the discoverer of Hitler's corpse for the Hero of the Soviet Union award, causing multiple potential bodies to be presented. Historian Peter Hoffmann, a specialist on Hitler's security detail, similarly doubts that he ever used doubles.

Legacy 

Footage of the body double identified as Gustav Weler was presented as Hitler's corpse in a post-war documentary. This was corrected in a 1966 documentary. In September 1992, Ada Petrova edited a still of the footage into a Russian television broadcast, which was criticized for implying the body was Hitler's. A few days later, Bezymenski claimed that the double was separate from Hitler's body, which he reaffirmed that the Soviets had found elsewhere "in the garden of the Chancellery".

In his 1995 book on Hitler's death, historian Anton Joachimsthaler disputes the purported Soviet autopsy report of Hitler's body, which was published by Bezymenski in 1968. Joachimsthaler argues that the Soviets never found Hitler's body, which must have been burnt to ashes. Joachimsthaler quotes esteemed German pathologist  as saying the alleged autopsy report "describes anything but Hitler". Similarly, historian Luke Daly-Groves states that "the Soviet soldiers picked up whatever mush they could find in front of Hitler's bunker exit, put it in a box and claimed it was the corpses of Adolf and Eva Hitler". Also in 1995, Bezymenski disclosed that his work had contained "deliberate lies", possibly including the manner of Hitler's death. In his book, he had claimed that if the dictator died from a gunshot wound, it was a coup de grâce to ensure his quick death after he took cyanide, not a suicide by gunshot.

In 1998, British author Ian Sayer received from an anonymous source what alleged to be a photocopy of a 427-page report from the U.S. Army's Counterintelligence Corps (CIC), apparently containing a 1948 interview of Gestapo chief Heinrich Müller, who was presumed missing in action in 1945, but claimed to have been retained by the CIC as an intelligence adviser and to have joined the CIA. According to Müller's purported account: a Hitler double was discovered in Breslau in 1941 and was seldom seen after July 1944, being sedated and kept hidden until April 1945; on April 22, Hitler, Braun and three of Hitler's associates departed by air for Hörsching Airport and were then flown to Barcelona; the double was later killed by a coup de grâce, dressed in Hitler's clothes, and buried. Joachimsthaler notes that the plane claimed to have been flown out of Berlin was considered a "total loss" by the Luftwaffe in May 1944, and the Junkers Ju 290 supposedly flown to Barcelona had been grounded in that city since the beginning of April 1945. Thereby, the claims of the dossier are considered by historians such as Joachimsthaler and Daly-Groves as an example of created "myths".

In a 2009 episode of History's MysteryQuest, a bone-specializing archaeologist collected samples from a skull fragment in the Soviet archives believed to be Hitler's. DNA and forensic examination indicated that the fragment, which had an exit wound from a gunshot through the back of the head, belonged to a woman less than 40 years old. On the same program, fringe author H. D. Baumann asserts that Hitler increased his use of doubles after a 1944 assassination attempt. Baumann claims that the darned-sock-wearing double, whose ears he points out are different than Hitler's and allegedly was two inches shorter, was killed by the Germans on 30 April 1945. Citing these details, as well as the notion that the bodies of Hitler and Braun were never found and Stalin's claim that Hitler escaped to Spain or Argentina, Baumann concludes that Hitler faked his death. In 2017, the National Police Gazette revived its decades-old potboiler defending such a possibility and called on the Russian government to allow the jawbone fragment to be DNA-tested to settle the matter.

Greek conspiracy theorist Peter Fotis Kapnistos, author of 2015 fringe book Hitler's Doubles, outlandishly claims that Hitler was replaced by a double after he was hospitalized near the end of World War I, citing personality changes and his increased nose width in later photographs. Amongst other rigmarole, Kapnistos claims that Hitler had four doubles: Schreck, stenographer Heinrich Berger (who was killed in the 20 July 1944 attempt to kill Hitler), Gustav Weler (whom discredited author W. Hugh Thomas said was found alive after the war), and—of all people—English occultist Aleister Crowley.

See also 
 
 
 Toothbrush moustache

References

Footnotes

Citations

Sources 
 
 
 
 
 
 
 

1945 deaths
Death of Adolf Hitler
Executed German people
German people of World War II
Propaganda in the Soviet Union